The following is a list of events affecting radio broadcasting in 2016. Events listed include radio program debuts, finales, cancellations, and station launches, closures and format changes, as well as information about controversies.

Notable events

January

February

March

April

May

June

July

August

September

October

November

December

Debuts

Closings

Deaths
January 5: Pierre Boulez, 90, conductor, composer and broadcaster
January 17
Kris Kelly, 45, American radio personality and programmer in the R&B/Hip-Hop and Top 40/CHR genres.
Ramblin' Lou Schriver, 86, American Country music performer (Grand Ole Opry, WWVA Jamboree), radio personality (WJJL Niagara Falls, New York and WWOL Lackawanna, New York) and longtime owner-operator of WXRL/1300: Lancaster, New York from 1970 to his death.
Velia Taneff, 86, American air personality at WLTH Gary, Indiana.
January 28: Buddy Cianci, 74, American politician and broadcaster from Providence, Rhode Island.
January 31: Terry Wogan, 77, Irish-British broadcaster.
February 2: Bob Elliott, 92. Longtime, US radio comedian and half of the comedy team of Bob and Ray.
February 8: Alejandro Nieto Molina, 48, SVP and GM/Radio for Univision Radio and radio executive/programming alumni for Spain's Cadena Ser, Groupo Prisa US, and Caracol.
February 20: Ove Verner Hansen, 83, Danish opera singer and actor who began his career with the Danish National Radio Choir
February 24: Eddie Einhorn, 80, presenter of the first nationwide radio and television broadcasts of college basketball in the United States.
February 29: Charlie Tuna, 71, US radio personality most recently known as a syndicated classic hits jockey.
March 23: 
Jim Roselle, 89, US radio personality (61 years at WJTN Jamestown, New York).
Joe Garagiola, Sr., 90, American baseball player turned commentator (radio work included the St. Louis Cardinals Radio Network, MLB on NBC Radio and the New York Yankees Radio Network).
March 27: Mother Angelica, 92, US Catholic nun and founder of WEWN Vandiver/Irondale, Alabama.
April 9: Stacy Fawcett, 45, US radio and television personality in the Dallas-Ft. Worth media market, working as an air personality at KVIL-FM.
April 11: Doug Banks, 57, American syndicated radio host whose The Doug Banks Show had aired nationwide since 1997.
April 14: Rod Reyes, 80, Filipino radio executive, former vice president and general manager of GMA Radio Television Arts
April 19: Denise Stewart-Bohn, US air personality at WCXT (Benton Harbor, Michigan)
May 1: Sydney Onayemi, 78, Nigerian-born Swedish DJ
May 25: Sherry-Ruth Francis, 52, US air personality at KRHN (Kerrville, Texas)
June 1: Lacy Neff, 49, US on-air personality at WVAQ (Morgantown, West Virginia). Winner of the National Association of Broadcasters' Marconi Award for Small Market Personality Of The Year twice, first in 2006 and again in 2009.
June 5: David Gilkey, US NPR photojournalist and Zabihullah Tamanna (Gilkey's translator)
June 12: Janet Waldo, 96, US radio, television and voice actress best known in radio for the title role in Meet Corliss Archer, among other various guest spots.
June 23: Ralph Stanley, 89, US bluegrass music pioneer whose radio career included 12 years at WCYB (Bristol, Virginia) and membership in the Grand Ole Opry.
June 26: Donna Kelley, 66, US news anchor on KARN-FM (Little Rock). 
July 4: Rod Hansen, 75. Multiple award-winning investigative reporter on WJR/760 (Detroit) from 1967 to 2005.
July 28: Jerry Doyle, 60. Actor turned radio host, heard on Talk Radio Network from the mid-2000s until his death.
August 16: Dennis Alvord, 68. Radio personality, an alumnus of KPWR/Los Angeles and KTFM/San Antonio, known on air as "Joe Nasty"
August 19: Horacio Salgán, 100, Argentine tango musician
August 27: Joy Browne, 71. Psychologist whose radio program had been on air since 1978 and aired nationwide since the early 1990s.
September 8: Eric Von Broadley, 58. Television and radio journalist, personality, and publisher in the Milwaukee media market, an alumnus of WMCS, WAWA and WNOV.
September 9: Bill Nojay, 59. Republican politician, attorney and syndicated radio host (show originated from WYSL Avon, New York).
September 11: "Crazy" Eddie Antar, 68. Electronics retailer infamous for his ubiquitous radio and television advertisements.
September 16: Tom Torbjornsen, 60, host of America's Car Show.
September 26: Ioan Gyuri Pascu, 55, Romanian singer, manager, producer and actor, originally discovered by Radio Vacanţa
September 30: Oscar Brand, 96, Canadian folk singer-songwriter and broadcaster
October 20: Mieke Telkamp, 82, Dutch singer
October 22: Herb Kent, 88, US radio host, WVAZ-FM, WVON.
November 4: Jean-Jacques Perrey, 87, French electronic music producer and broadcaster
November 29: Allan Zavod, 71, Australian composer, many of whose works were premiered on radio
December 2: Chelsea Dolan, 27, US DJ/musician who also did an airshift at KALX Berkeley-San Francisco.
December 12: Tom Moffatt, 85, US television/radio personality and concert promoter who was as a fixture in the Honolulu media market as a DJ at KHVH, KPOA, KPOI, and, until his death, KKOL-FM.
December 17:Bob Coburn, 68, US radio personality at KLOS Los Angeles and host of Rockline
December 18: Bill Florian, 84, Founder and original owner of WNIB (now WDRV) Chicago from 1955 to 1997.

References

 
Radio by year